The Metz–Luxembourg railway is a  French/Luxembourgish railway line, that connects the French Lorraine region to Luxembourg. The railway was opened between 1854 and 1859. It is an important international railway connection. The part in Luxembourg is designated as CFL Line 90.

Route
The line leaves Metz in a northern direction, downstream along the Moselle river. It passes through the industrial area between Metz and Thionville. It crosses the Luxembourg border, finally reaching the capital Luxembourg (city).

Main stations
The main stations on the Metz–Luxembourg railway are:
 Gare de Metz-Ville
 Gare de Thionville
 Luxembourg railway station

Services
The Metz–Luxembourg railway is used by the following passenger services:
TGV high speed services from Paris to Luxembourg 
EuroCity services from Brussels to Switzerland, and from Paris to Luxembourg
Intercités night services from Luxembourg to Nice and Portbou
TER Grand Est regional services
CFL Line 60 and Line 90

References

Railway lines in Grand Est
Cross-border railway lines in France
Cross-border railway lines in Luxembourg
France–Luxembourg border